Scott Wilson (January 11, 1870 – October 22, 1942) was a United States circuit judge of the United States Court of Appeals for the First Circuit.

Education and career

Born on January 11, 1870, in Falmouth, Maine, Wilson attended the University of Pennsylvania and then received an Artium Baccalaureus degree in 1892 from Bates College. He read law in 1895, under the supervision of Joseph W. Symonds, and entered private practice in Portland, Maine from 1895 to 1918. He was city solicitor of Deering, Maine in 1899. He was an assistant county attorney of Cumberland County, Maine from 1900 to 1902. He was city solicitor of Portland from 1902 to 1905. He was the Attorney General of Maine from 1913 to 1914. He was a justice of the Maine Supreme Judicial Court from 1918 to 1929, serving as chief justice from 1925 to 1929.

Federal judicial service

Wilson was nominated by President Herbert Hoover on September 9, 1929, to a seat on the United States Court of Appeals for the First Circuit vacated by Judge Charles Fletcher Johnson. He was confirmed by the United States Senate on October 2, 1929, and received his commission the same day. He was a member of the Conference of Senior Circuit Judges (now the Judicial Conference of the United States) in 1939. He assumed senior status on March 31, 1940. His service terminated on October 22, 1942, due to his death in Portland.

See also
 List of Bates College people
 Herbert Hoover judicial appointments

References

Sources
 

Maine lawyers
American prosecutors
Bates College alumni
University of Pennsylvania alumni
University of Pennsylvania Law School alumni
U.S. state supreme court judges admitted to the practice of law by reading law
United States federal judges admitted to the practice of law by reading law
Justices of the Maine Supreme Judicial Court
Judges of the United States Court of Appeals for the First Circuit
United States court of appeals judges appointed by Herbert Hoover
20th-century American judges
Maine Attorneys General
Lawyers from Portland, Maine
People from Falmouth, Maine
1870 births
1942 deaths